Hoplolatilus is a genus of tilefishes native to the Indian Ocean and the western Pacific Ocean. The chameleon tilefish (Hoplolatilus chlupatyi), also known as the flashing tilefish, is well known in particular in the aquarium hobby due to its unique ability to change colors in an instant with the help of specialized proteins in its skin that can reflect light in different wavelengths, allowing it to cycle between primary and secondary colors on the light spectrum.

Species
There are currently 13 recognized species in this genus:
 Hoplolatilus chlupatyi Klausewitz, McCosker, J. E. Randall & Zetzsche, 1978 (Chameleon sand tilefish)
 Hoplolatilus cuniculus J. E. Randall & Dooley, 1974 (Dusky tilefish)
 Hoplolatilus erdmanni G. R. Allen, 2007 (Triton tilefish)
 Hoplolatilus fourmanoiri J. L. B. Smith, 1964 (Yellow-spotted tilefish)
 Hoplolatilus fronticinctus (Günther, 1887) (Pastel tilefish)
 Hoplolatilus geo H. Fricke & Kacher, 1982
 Hoplolatilus luteus G. R. Allen & Kuiter, 1989 (Yellow tilefish)
 Hoplolatilus marcosi W. E. Burgess, 1978 (Redback sand tilefish)
 Hoplolatilus oreni (E. Clark & Ben-Tuvia, 1973)
 Hoplolatilus pohle Earle & Pyle, 1997 (Pohle's tilefish)
 Hoplolatilus purpureus W. E. Burgess, 1978 (Purple sand tilefish)
 Hoplolatilus randalli G. R. Allen, Erdmann & A. M. Hamilton, 2010 (Randall's tilefish)
 Hoplolatilus starcki J. E. Randall & Dooley, 1974 (Stark's tilefish)

References

Malacanthidae
Taxa named by Albert Günther